Manuel Elías Fernández Guzmán (born 25 January 1989) is an Uruguayan-Chilean footballer that currently plays for Primera División de Chile side Unión Española.

Personal life
Fernández naturalized Chilean by residence in 2023.

References

External links
 
 

1989 births
Living people
Uruguayan footballers
Uruguayan expatriate footballers
Naturalized citizens of Chile
Uruguayan emigrants to Chile
Chilean footballers
Racing Club de Montevideo players
Deportes Concepción (Chile) footballers
Coquimbo Unido footballers
Audax Italiano footballers
Unión Española footballers
Uruguayan Primera División players
Primera B de Chile players
Chilean Primera División players
Uruguayan expatriate sportspeople in Chile
Expatriate footballers in Chile
Association football defenders